The Judge Advocate General's Corps also known as the "JAG Corps" or "JAG" is the legal arm of the United States Air Force.

History 
The United States Air Force became a separate military service in September 1947. On June 25, 1948, Congress established an office of The Judge Advocate General (TJAG) in the United States Air Force. On July 8, 1949, the Air Force Chief of Staff designated 205 attorneys Air Force Judge Advocates. Thus, ironically, there were Air Force judge advocates three months before there was an Air Force Judge Advocate General. Following the promulgation of enabling legislation, the Air Force Judge Advocate General's Department was established on January 25, 1949, by Department of the Air Force General Order No. 7 (as amended by General Order No. 17, May 15, 1949). While this event was clearly the birth of the department, it really represented an interim step, providing the Air Force authority to administer its military justice system within the existing Air Force structure of the time until other legislation (what became the Uniform Code of Military Justice) could be developed and enacted. The department was originally a part of the Air Force Personnel Branch but became a separate entity reporting directly to the Air Force Chief of Staff in February 1950. The first Air Force judge advocate general, Major General Reginald C. Harmon, believed it important for Air Force JAGs to remain a part of a functionally interconnected military department. For that reason, the concept of a separate corps was discarded in favor of the department that existed until 2003.

In 2003, the Judge Advocate General's Department was renamed to the Judge Advocate General's Corps by order of the Secretary of the Air Force, Dr. James G. Roche. In December 2004, the Air Force Judge Advocate General, Thomas J. Fiscus, accepted non-judicial punishment under Article 15 of the UCMJ, for conduct unbecoming of an officer and obstruction of justice related to numerous unprofessional sexual relationships with subordinates. Upon his retirement, Fiscus was reduced two grades, to colonel. Major General Jack Rives, the Deputy Judge Advocate General, became the Air Force Judge Advocate General as of February 2006. On July 23, 2008, General Rives was confirmed as a lieutenant general, becoming the first TJAG to hold that rank.

On December 15, 2009, the President nominated Brigadier General Richard C. Harding to serve as the 16th Judge Advocate General. On February 2, 2010, the Senate Armed Services Committee endorsed the nomination and the Senate voted to confirm the nomination. Lieutenant General Rives retired on February 5, 2010, accepting the position of Executive Director and Chief Operating Officer of the American Bar Association, and now-Lieutenant General Richard Harding became The 16th Judge Advocate General of the Air Force. His formal investiture and promotion ceremony occurred on February 23, 2010.  General Harding's term as The Judge Advocate General ended on January 31, 2014.

On May 22, 2014, the Senate confirmed Brigadier General Christopher F. Burne to serve as the 17th Judge Advocate General in the grade of lieutenant general.  He was promoted and began duties as The Judge Advocate General on the following day.  Lieutenant General Burne's term as The Judge Advocate General ended on May 18, 2018.

On January 30, 2018, the Senate confirmed Major General Jeffrey A. Rockwell, who was then serving as Deputy Judge Advocate General, to serve as the 18th Judge Advocate General in the grade of lieutenant general.  That same day, the Senate also confirmed Brigadier General Charles L. Plummer to serve as Deputy Judge Advocate General in the grade of major general.  Lieutenant General Rockwell's formal investiture ceremony occurred on May 21, 2018.

JAG School 

The Air Force Judge Advocate General's School was founded in 1950 and has been located in the William Louis Dickinson Law Center, at Maxwell Air Force Base in Montgomery, Alabama, since 1993. The school provides instruction to new judge advocates and paralegals, in addition to offering approximately 30 continuing legal education courses. The school publishes scholarly legal journals such as The Air Force Law Review, semiannually, and The Reporter online. The school also produces The Military Commander and the Law, a publication that is invaluable not only to judge advocates, but commanders and first sergeants in handling the myriad of legal issues that arise with a squadron or wing, and for the continued enforcement of good order and discipline.

List of Judge Advocates General of the Air Force

See also
General Counsel of the Air Force
Air Force Court of Criminal Appeals
U.S. Army Judge Advocate General's Corps
U.S. Navy Judge Advocate General's Corps
U.S. Marine Corps Judge Advocate Division
U.S. Coast Guard Legal Division
Judge Advocate General's Corps
Judge Advocate General
Military justice
Air Force Office of Special Investigations
United Kingdom
 Judge Advocate of the Fleet
 Judge Advocate General (United Kingdom)
Canada
 Judge Advocate General (Canada)

References

External links
Air Force JAG Corps
Career detail - Judge Advocate Officer - JAG (Attorney)
Air Force Court-Martial Docket
The Air Force JAG Corps Reporter

 
Legal occupations in the military
United States Air Force specialisms